Running Scared is a 2006 neo-noir action thriller film directed and written by Wayne Kramer. The film stars Paul Walker, Cameron Bright, Vera Farmiga and Chazz Palminteri. Its plot follows a low-ranking mafioso who is ordered to get rid of a gun used to kill corrupt cops only to find himself in a race against time when the murder weapon falls into the wrong hands.

Running Scared was released in the United States on February 24, 2006, by New Line Cinema, and in Germany on April 13, 2006, by 3L Filmverleih.

Plot
A large drug deal between New Jersey mobsters and a Jamaican gang goes awry, leading to a shootout that kills two corrupt police officers who were attempting to rob the gangs. Mobster Tommy Perello orders his subordinate, Joey Gazelle, to dispose of the guns; Joey goes home to his wife Teresa and their ten-and-a-half-year-old son Nicky, where he stashes the weapons in his basement. Unbeknownst to him, Nicky and his friend Oleg secretly watch him.

Oleg steals one of the guns before heading home to his mother Mila and his abusive stepfather, Anzor. After Anzor becomes belligerent, Oleg shoots him before leaving the house. When Joey goes to investigate the disturbance, he finds a wounded Anzor who then describes the gun. Joey realizes that it is one of the weapons he hid earlier, and rushes to track down Oleg before the police do.

Throughout the night, Oleg runs into people living outside mainstream society: a homeless crack addict, a drug dealer, a prostitute, Divina, and her abusive pimp Lester. After Oleg helps Divina, she decides to look after him. Divina takes him to a diner where they find Joey, who is explaining to his boss Frankie Perello that Oleg has the gun. Oleg stashes the gun in the diner bathroom, and after leaving with Divina, he is found by police officers who then return him to Anzor.

Oleg once again escapes, and is taken in by a kindly family. When Oleg becomes suspicious of them, he discreetly calls Teresa, who then arrives and threatens her way into their apartment. She rescues Oleg and tells him to leave with the other children, then murders the parents after finding evidence of snuff films and other paraphernalia. Meanwhile, Joey continues his search, and eventually finds Oleg. However, just before he can retrieve the gun, both he and Oleg are found by Tommy, who goes to take them to Frankie.

Tommy takes Joey and Oleg to an ice hockey rink to meet Frankie and Russian mob boss Ivan. Ivan has brought Anzor to try and get Oleg to tell them the source of the gun he used. After Ivan slaps the boy, Joey lashes out at him, and he, in turn, is subdued and beaten by Ivan's thugs. When Anzor refuses to kill Oleg, Ivan kills him, and then turns to kill Oleg. Before he can, Joey distracts him by accusing Frankie of planning to attack the Russians because Anzor was cooking meth in Frankie's territory. A shootout ensues between the two gangs, leading to the deaths of Tommy and Ivan. When Frankie attempts to shoot Joey, the latter reveals that he is an undercover FBI agent, showing a hidden wire under his shirt. Oleg then distracts Frankie, allowing Joey to disarm and kill him. Joey and Oleg then exit as the FBI and local police storm the building.

Joey and Oleg return to the diner for breakfast, and they encounter Lester holding the gun that Oleg had hidden earlier. In the ensuing struggle, Lester shoots Joey in the stomach, but not before Joey fatally stabs Lester with a switchblade. Joey and Oleg struggle to return to Teresa and Nicky. Meanwhile, Mila, thinking Oleg is dead, commits suicide by blowing herself up in Anzor's meth lab. Just as Teresa and Nicky rush outside to investigate, they see Joey crash his car after losing consciousness.

Days later, Teresa and Nicky attend Joey's funeral along with Oleg, who has been adopted by the family. They drive out to a small farmhouse, where Joey emerges, having faked his death to protect himself and his family after being outed.

Cast

Production
Asked about his sex scene with Vera Farmiga, Paul Walker revealed that there was not any kind of prosthetic application on the actress privates when he's working on down there.

Reception

Box office
Running Scared opened with $3,381,974 from 1,611 screens, for an average of $2,099 per theater. It went on to earn a total of $9.4 million worldwide, failing to recoup its modest budget of $15 million.

Critical response
Running Scared received mixed reviews from film critics. It currently holds a 41% approval rating on film review aggregator website Rotten Tomatoes, where the general consensus states: "This film runs with frenetic energy punctuated by gratuitous violence but sorely lacks in plot, character development and stylistic flair." The film holds an average of 41 out of 100, based on 30 reviews, on film review site Metacritic.

Justin Chang of Variety described Whitaker's cinematography, which primarily used Steadicam and crane shots, as "[dazzling] with a desaturated palette that nevertheless has a rich, grimy luster". He also noted the film had an odd plot, which was disarming given it was shot in Prague rather than somewhere that looks closer to New Jersey. Sam Wigley of Sight and Sound said the vicious gangland depicted in the film resembles an "iniquitous fairytale realm", although it is dark, and "passes in a vertiginous blur of comic-book hyper-reality".

References

External links
 
 
 
 
 

2006 action thriller films
2006 crime drama films
2006 crime thriller films
American action thriller films
American crime drama films
American crime thriller films
Films about the American Mafia
Films about the Russian Mafia
Films set in New Jersey
Films shot in New Jersey
Films shot in the Czech Republic
English-language German films
German action thriller films
American neo-noir films
New Line Cinema films
2000s Russian-language films
Films scored by Mark Isham
Films directed by Wayne Kramer (filmmaker)
German crime thriller films
Films about child sexual abuse
Films about snuff films
2000s American films
2000s German films